Mane Devru is a 1993 Indian Kannada language romantic drama film directed and enacted by V. Ravichandran along with Sudharani pairing together for the first time. The supporting cast features K. S. Ashwath, Tennis Krishna, Disco Shanti among others.

The film was a remake of K. Bhagyaraj's Tamil  film Mouna Geethangal (1981) and was also remade in Hindi as Ek Hi Bhool (1981).

Cast 

 V. Ravichandran as Ranganath
 Sudharani as Janaki
 K. S. Ashwath
 Disco Shanti
 Tennis Krishna
 Umesh
 Sathyajit
 Kashi
 Venki
 Shanthamma
 Dingri Nagaraj
 Sadashiva Brahmavar

Soundtrack

Tracks
Hamsalekha composed the film's soundtrack and penned the lyrics.

References 

1993 films
1990s Kannada-language films
Films scored by Hamsalekha
Indian romantic drama films
Kannada remakes of Tamil films
Films directed by V. Ravichandran
1993 romantic drama films